Swanstrom or Swanström is a surname. Notable people with the surname include:

Dwight A. Swanstrom (1905–1978), American businessman and politician
Edward Ernest Swanstrom (1903–1985), American Roman Catholic Titular Bishop of Arba, Auxiliary Bishop of New York
J. Edward Swanstrom (1853–1911), American lawyer and politician from New York
Jack Swanstrom (born 1961), American educator and film director
Karin Swanström (1873–1942), Swedish actress, producer and director